The Georgia Women of Achievement (GWA) recognizes women natives or residents of the U.S. state of Georgia for their significant achievements or statewide contributions. The concept was first proposed by Rosalynn Carter in 1988. The first induction was in 1992 at Wesleyan College, and has continued annually. The induction ceremonies are held each year during March, designated as Women's History Month. The organization consists of a Board of Trustees and a Board of Selections. Nominees must have been dead no less than ten years. Georgians, or those associated with Georgia, are selected based on the individual's impact on society.  Nominations are proposed through documentation and an online nomination form, and must be submitted prior to October of any given year. GWA has traveling exhibits and speakers available upon request.

Inductees

Footnotes

References

Further information

External links
 Georgia Women of Achievement

Women's halls of fame
Lists of American women
State halls of fame in the United States
Lists of people from Georgia (U.S. state)
Halls of fame in Georgia (U.S. state)
Awards established in 1992
1992 establishments in Georgia (U.S. state)
History of women in Georgia (U.S. state)